Calyptra hokkaida is a moth of the  family Erebidae. It has been found in China and Japan.

References

Calpinae
Moths of Japan
Moths described in 1922